Flat-panel Volume CT is a technique under development to make computed tomography images with improved performance (in particular, with improved spatial resolution). The key difference between volume CT and traditional CT is that volume CT uses a two-dimensional x-ray detector orientation (usually in a square panel orientation), to take multiple two-dimensional images. On the other hand, the conventional CT uses a one-dimensional x-ray detector orientation (a row of detectors) to take one-dimensional x-ray images.

A CT machine consists of an x-ray source, an x-ray detector, a series of moving stages (Gantry) and computers to assemble the x-ray data into an image. The x-ray beam used in volume CT is cone shaped, in contrast to the fan shaped beam of the regular CT scanner. This cone shape allows the beam to cover the two-dimensional detector panel.

See also
 Industrial CT Scanning
 Radiology
 Computed Tomography
 Medical Imaging
 Cone beam reconstruction

References

 Flat-panel volume CT: fundamental principles, technology, and applications. Gupta R, Cheung AC, Bartling SH, Lisauskas J, Grasruck M, Leidecker C, Schmidt B, Flohr T, Brady TJ. Radiographics. 2008 Nov-Dec;28(7):2009-22. 
 Ultra-high resolution flat-panel volume CT: fundamental principles, design architecture, and system characterization. Gupta R, Grasruck M, Suess C, Bartling SH, Schmidt B, Stierstorfer K, Popescu S, Brady T, Flohr T. Eur Radiol. 2006 Jun;16(6):1191-205. Epub 2006 Mar 10. 

Medical equipment
Tomography